Tolytia is a genus of moths in the family Lasiocampidae. The genus was erected by Schaus in 1924.

Species
Tolytia multilinea Schaus, 1906
Tolytia sana Dognin, 1916
Tolytia sanguilenta Dognin, 1916

References

Lasiocampidae